Benjamin Mitchell or Ben Mitchell may refer to:
 Benjamin Grant Mitchell, Australian singer-songwriter, actor and writer
 Ben Mitchell (EastEnders), character from the BBC soap opera EastEnders
 Ben Mitchell (film character), character in the film Wolf Creek
 Ben Mitchell (rugby union) (born 1994), Anglo-Irish rugby union player
 Benjamin Mitchell (actor) (born 1979), actor in New Zealand soap opera Shortland Street
 Benjamin Mitchell (tennis) (born 1992), Australian tennis player
 Benjamin M. Mitchell (1869–1927), American politician